Chuck Hufstetler (born July 7, 1956) is an American politician who has served in the Georgia State Senate from the 52nd district since 2013.

References

1956 births
Living people
Republican Party Georgia (U.S. state) state senators
21st-century American politicians